A crater chain is a line of craters along the surface of an astronomical body. The descriptor term for crater chains is catena , plural catenae  (Latin for "chain"), as specified by the International Astronomical Union's rules on planetary nomenclature.

Many examples of such chains are thought to have been formed by the impact of a body that was broken up by tidal forces into a string of smaller objects following roughly the same orbit. An example of such a tidally disrupted body that was observed prior to its impact on Jupiter is Comet Shoemaker-Levy 9. During the Voyager observations of the Jupiter system, planetary scientists identified 13 crater chains on Callisto and three on Ganymede (except those formed by secondary craters). Later some of these chains turned out to be secondary or tectonic features, but some other chains were discovered. As of 1996, 8 primary chains on Callisto and 3 on Ganymede were confirmed.

Other cases, such as many of those on Mars, represent chains of collapse pits associated with grabens (see, for example, the Tithoniae Catenae near Tithonium Chasma).

Crater chains seen on the Moon often radiate from larger craters, and in such cases are thought to be either caused by secondary impacts of the larger crater's ejecta or by volcanic venting activity along a rift.

See also
Moon
List of catenae on the Moon
Mars
List of catenae on Mars
Ceres
List of catenae on Ceres
Jupiter
List of catenae on Callisto
List of catenae on Ganymede
List of catenae on Io
Saturn
List of catenae on Rhea
List of catenae on Dione
Neptune
List of catenae on Triton

References

External links
Catena on Callisto
Lunar Crater Chains
Moon nomenclature catenae

Impact craters on the Moon
Planetary geology